Uwe Boensch (born October 15, 1958) was the FIDE Senior Trainer and Chess Grandmaster from West Germany. he got the Chess Grandmaster title from the FIDE in the year 1986. He is the active member of  FIDE Trainers' Commission (TRG).

Notable Tournaments

References 

Chess grandmasters
Chess arbiters
1958 births
Living people
German chess players